Seiya (星矢) is a masculine name of Japanese origin. It is a common masculine Japanese given name.

Possible writings

Seiya can be written in Hiragana as せいや. In Kanji, it can be alternatively rendered as;

星矢 "star, heavenly body of arrow"
清耶 "pure, father"
正夜 "correct, night"
生八 "life, eight"
成也 "successful, to be"
声弥 "voice, extensive complete"
盛哉 "prosper, how"
聖野 "holy, field"
世乎 "world, question"
西椰 "west, coconut tree"
征椰 "conquer, coconut tree"

People with the name
Seiya Adachi (安達安 星矢, born 1995), Japanese water polo player
Seiya Ando (安藤 誓哉, born 1992), Japanese basketball player
Asahifuji Seiya (旭富士 正也, born 1960), Japanese sumo wrestler
Seiya Fujita (藤田 征也, born 1987), Japanese footballer
Seiya Hosokawa (細川 成也, born 1988), Japanese baseball player
, Japanese baseball player
Seiya Kato (加藤聖哉, born 1994), Japanese footballer
Seiya Kinami (木浪 聖也, born 1994), Japanese baseball infielder
Seiya Kishikawa (岸川聖也, born 1987), Japanese table tennis player
Seiya Kitano (星矢 北野, born 1997), Japanese footballer
Seiya Kojima (小島 聖矢, born 1989) Japanese footballer 
Seiya Kondō (近藤 誠也, born 1996), Japanese shogi player
Seiya Motoki (元木 聖也, born 1993), Japanese actor 
Seiya Nakagawa (中川 誠也, born, 1993), Japanese baseball player 
Seiya Nakano (中野誠也, born 1995), is a Japanese football player
Seiya Niizeki (新関 成弥, born, 1999), Japanese football player
Seiya Sakamoto (坂本 清耶, born 1944), Japanese water polo player
Seiya Sanada (真田 聖也, born 1988), Japanese professional wrestler
Seiya Sugishita (杉下 聖也, born 1988), Japanese footballer
Seiya Suzuki (鈴木 誠也, born 1994), Japanese baseball player
Seiya Yamaguchi (山口 聖矢, born 1993), is a Japanese football player

Fictional characters
Pegasus Seiya, the main character in the manga series Saint Seiya
, a character in the manga series Sailor Moon
 Seiya Ryuguin, the main protagonist of the light novel series Cautious Hero: The Hero Is Overpowered but Overly Cautious
 Seiya Yaboshi, a character in the manga series UFO Baby
 Seiya Kanie, protagonist of the light novel series Amagi Brilliant Park
 Seiya Takehaya, a character in the light novel series Tsurune

Japanese masculine given names